UScoCTIO 108 is a binary system, approximately 470 light-years away in the Upper Scorpius (USco) OB association.  The primary, UScoCTIO 108A, with mass around 0.06 solar masses, is a brown dwarf or low-mass red dwarf.  The secondary, UScoCTIO 108B, with a mass around the deuterium burning limit of 13 Jupiter masses, would be classified as either a brown dwarf or an extrasolar planet.

The primary component of the system was discovered in 2000 as a possible member of the Upper Scorpius association, based on its position in a HR diagram, in a search for new member of the association by the Cerro Tololo Inter-American Observatory (CTIO), where it received the designation UScoCTIO 108. Later, spectroscopic and photometric observations confirmed that the object is a real member of the association, showing signs of low gravity and youth, and estimated a mass of 60 times the mass of Jupiter (MJ), an effective temperature of 2,800 K and a spectral type of M7. The low mass indicates that the object is not able to sustain hydrogen fusion, making it a brown dwarf.

The secondary member of the system was found in 2008 as an object located at a separation of 4.6 arcseconds, which corresponds to a physical separation of more than 670 AU, and is also a confirmed member of the Upper Scorpius association. Its spectrum shows it is also a cold substellar object, with an effective temperature of 2,300 K and a spectral type of M9.5. Its mass was originally estimated at 14 MJ, very close to the nominal boundary between planets and brown dwarf, but a recent revision of the age of the Upper Scorpius association to 11 million years increased this value to 16 MJ, indicating that the object is likely a low mass brown dwarf. The physical association between the two brown dwarfs has not been confirmed by observation of common proper motion, but is considered very likely given the proximity between them.

The minimum separation between the two brown dwarfs, 670 AU, is much larger than the mean of other similar mass systems, and indicates that the pair (if they really form a binary system) is very weakly bound, with an escape velocity for the secondary component of only 0.4 km/s. Considering the average stellar density in an association like Upper Scorpius, it is estimated that perturbations by passing stars will cause the rupture of the system in a few million years.

Observations by the infrared telescope WISE revealed excess emission at 12 and 22 μm, indicating the presence of a debris disk around the brown dwarf.

See also
 SDSS J1416+1348
 2M1101AB
 Oph 162225-240515
 Binary brown dwarfs

References

External links
 Star: UScoCTIO 108, Extrasolar Planets Encyclopaedia.  Accessed on line June 17, 2008.

Brown dwarfs
M-type main-sequence stars
Scorpius (constellation)
Upper Scorpius